Moncloa-Aravaca is a district of the municipality of Madrid, Spain. It is located to the northwest of the city centre, spanning across both banks of the Manzanares. It is made up of the neighborhoods of Aravaca, Argüelles, Casa de Campo, Ciudad Universitaria, El Plantío, Valdemarín and Valdezarza.

The Palace of Moncloa, located in Ciudad Universitaria, is the residence of the Spanish Prime Minister.

Geography

Subdivision
The district is administratively divided into 7 neighborhoods:

Education

The Colegio Japonés de Madrid, the Japanese international school in Madrid, is located in the El Plantío area.

See also

Faro de Moncloa
Palacio de la Moncloa

References

External links 

 
Districts of Madrid